Central African cuisine includes the cuisines, cooking traditions, practices, ingredients and foods of the Central African Republic (CAR). Indigenous agriculture in the country includes millet, sorgum, banana, yam, okra, yellow onion, garlic, spinach, rice and palm oil. Imported crops of American origin include maize, manioc (cassava), peanuts, chili peppers, sweet potato and tomato. Additional foods include onions, garlic, chiles and peanuts.

Meat can be scarce in the Central African Republic, although fish is used in a variety of dishes, and other sources of protein include peanuts and insects such as cicadas, grasshoppers, crickets and termites. Common meats in Central African cuisine include chicken and goat. Wild game is also hunted, especially in rural areas and during the grass burning dry-season. Staple foods include starches, such as millet, rice, sesame and sorghum. A variety of vegetables and sauces are also consumed.

Roadside stalls sell foods such as baked goods and makara (a type of fried bread), sandwiches, barbecued meat and snacks. In the forests and in markets of Bangui where forest items are sold, caterpillars and the koko leaf are eaten. Restaurants are mostly for expatriates. Wild tubers, leaves, and mushrooms are used. Palm oil is widely used in various dishes.

The capital city of Bangui has western foods and hotel restaurants. The legal drinking age is 18. Muslims are prohibited from drinking alcohol. The PK5 area is known for its smaller restaurants serving with reasonably priced traditional dishes served.

Common foods and dishes

 Bushmeat
 Cassava and cassava greens
 Chicken and cumin stew
 Chichinga, skewered barbecued goat
 Egusi sauce, common in many areas of Central Africa
 Fish, such as Capitaine (Nile perch), which is fished at the river in Bangui
 Fruit, such as oranges, pineapple, plantain and banana
 Foutou, pounded plantains Both fufu and foutou are eaten like bread and often served with stews, soups and sauces  Mashed yams are also sometimes used to prepare foutou.
 Fufu, pounded cassava
 Fulani boullie, a porridge with rice, peanut butter, millet flour and lemon
 Gozo, a paste prepared from cassava flour
 Kanda ti nyma, spicy meatballs made with beef
 Muamba de galinha, chicken with okra and palm oil
 Muamba, a stew made with minced palm nuts. Tomato, peanuts and chicken are often added
 Palm butter soup, prepared with palm butter
 Spinach, often cooked with groundnuts
 Spinach stew
 Shrimp with boiled sweet potato/boiled yam
 Yam, which is indigenous to the Central African Republic  In the mid 1800s, additional new yam varieties were introduced by Europeans.

Beverages

Non-alcoholic beverages
 Coffee
 Tea (tea and coffee are prepared with sugar and evaporated milk from cans)
 Ginger beer
 Karkanji is a hibiscus flower drink from the north.

Alcoholic beverages
 Palm wine
 Banana wine
 Soft drinks
 Traditional beer used sorghum
 Beer brands include Mocaf and Export
 Alcohol made from cassava or sorghum

Cuisine in Bangui

Bangui is the capital of the Central African Republic, and the staple diet of the people there includes cassava, rice, squash, pumpkins and plantains (served with a sauce) and grilled meat. Okra or gombo is a popular vegetable. Peanuts and peanut butter are widely used. Game is popular, as are the fish-based dishes such as maboké. Manioc flour is used for preparing fufu.

There are three types of restaurants in Bangui. Some focus on foreign cuisine, such as Relais des Chasses, La Tentation and L'Escale, which are orientated towards French food, and Ali Baba and Beyrouth, which serve Lebanese cuisine. There are a large number of African restaurants, such as the Madame M'boka, a favorite of the locals. A number of bars and street food stalls complement Bangui's culinary scene.

Alcoholic beverages served are locally brewed beer, palm wine and banana wine. Non-alcoholic beverages that are drunk include ginger beer. Village ecologique Boali en RCA in Boali is known for its local dishes.

Food scarcity

CAR's potential agricultural output can feed the entire population; however, four coups have occurred during the last decade which has significantly reduced agriculture and food production. These political and economic crises have caused significant food shortages due to the burning of agricultural fields, food storage areas and villages by armed groups.

History
France once colonized what is now the country of Central African Republic as part French Equatorial Africa, and French influences are present in the nation's cuisine, including French bread and wine. During the 19th century Arab slave traders brought Middle Eastern influences. Earlier in its history it was then part of empires like Kanem-Bornu and Dafour based around Lake Chad, and its cuisine is similar to that of surrounding countries. Today the population is mostly Christian with Muslims in a majority in the north.

See also
 African cuisine
 List of African cuisines
 List of African dishes

References

Central African Republic